Agrammatism is a characteristic of non-fluent aphasia.  Individuals with agrammatism present with speech that is characterized by containing mainly content words, with a lack of function words.  For example, when asked to describe a picture of children playing in the park, the affected individual responds with, "trees..children..run." People with agrammatism may have telegraphic speech, a unique speech pattern with simplified formation of sentences (in which many or all function words are omitted), akin to that found in telegraph messages. Deficits in agrammaticism are often language-specific, however—in other words, "agrammaticism" in speakers of one language may present differently from in speakers of another.

Errors made in agrammatism depend on the severity of aphasia. In severe forms language production is severely telegraphic and in more mild to moderate cases  necessary elements for sentence construction are missing.  Common errors include errors in tense, number, and gender. Patients also find it very hard to produce sentences involving "movement" of elements, such as passive sentences, wh-questions or complex sentences.

Agrammatism is seen in many brain disease syndromes, including expressive aphasia and traumatic brain injury.


History 
Agrammatism was first coined by Adolf Kussmaul in 1887 to explain the inability to form words grammatically and to syntactically order them into a sentence. Later on, Harold Goodglass defined the term as the omission of connective words, auxiliaries and inflectional morphemes, all of these generating a speech production with extremely rudimentary grammar. Agrammatism, today seen as a symptom of the Broca's syndrome (Tesak & Code, 2008), has been also referred as 'motor aphasia' (Goldstein, 1948), 'syntactic aphasia' (Wepman & Jones, 1964), 'efferent motor aphasia' (Luria, 1970), and 'non-fluent aphasia' (Goodglass et al., 1964).

The early accounts of agrammatism involved cases of German and French  participants. The greater sophistication of the German school of aphasiology at the turn of the 20th century and also the fact that both German and French are highly inflected languages, might have been triggers for that situation (Code, 1991). Nowadays, the image has slightly changed: grammatical impairment has been found to be selective rather than complete, and a cross-linguistic perspective under the framework of Universal Grammar (UG) together with a shift from morphosyntax to morphosemantics is à la page. Now the focus of study in agrammatism embraces all natural languages and the idiosyncrasies scholars think a specific language has are put in relation to other languages so as to better understand agrammatism, help its treatment, and review and advance in the field of theoretical linguistics.

There is little written about agrammatism in Catalan. The beginnings of the field should be encountered in the work of Peña-Casanova & Bagunyà-Durich (1998), and Junque et al. (1989). These papers do not describe case reports, they are rather dealing with more general topics such as lesion localization or rehabilitation of agrammatic patients. The most updated studies could be found in the work of Martínez-Ferreiro (2009). The work of Martínez-Ferreiro is under the so-called Tree Pruning Hypothesis (TPH) of Friedmann & Grodzinsky (2007). Such a hypothesis is somewhat lagging behind after the findings in Bastiaanse (2008) have been proved by means of a re-analysis of data from Nanousi et al. (2006) and Lee et al. (2008), and the work of Yarbay Duman & Bastiaanse (2009). Other rather updated work for agrammatism in Catalan should be found in Martínez-Ferreiro et Gavarró (2007), in Gavarró (2008, 2003a, 2003b, 2002), Balaguer et al. (2004), in Peña-Casanova et al. (2001), and in Sánchez-Casas (2001).

From a cross-linguistic perspective under the framework of Universal Grammar (UG), grammatical impairment in agrammatism has been found to be selective rather than complete. Under this line of thought, the impairment in tense production for agrammatic speakers is currently being approached in different natural languages by means of the study of verb inflection for tense in contrast to agreement (a morphosyntactic approach) and also, more recently, by means of the study of time reference (which, in a sense, should be seen closer to morphosemantics).  The type of studies this paper should be related with are those dealing with tense impairment under the framework of time reference. Prior to explaining that, to help understand the goals of such research, it is good to give a taste of the shift from morphosyntax to morphosemantics the study of agrammatism is undergoing.

Verb Inflection 
Verb inflection for tense has been found to be problematic in several languages.  Different scholars have come up with different theories to explain it: Friedman & Grodzinsky (1997) introduced the so-called Tree Pruning Hypothesis (TPH) from the study of Hebrew, Arabic, and English; the same hypothesis has been proved by Gavarró & Martínez-Ferreiro (2007) for what they called Ibero-Romance (that is, Catalan, Galician, and Castilian); Wenzlaff & Clahsen  (2004; 2005) introduced the Tense Underespecification Hypothesis (TUH) for German, and by the same time Bruchert et al. (2005) introduced the Tense and Agreement Underespecification Hypothesis (TAUH) for the same language; and Lee et al. (2008), and Faroqi-Shah & Dickey (2009) introduced a morphosemantic hypothesis, arguing that the diacritic tense features are affected in English agrammatism.

Bastiaanse (2008) did not find such dissociation for Dutch but rather that reference to the past is more impaired regardless of verb inflection or agreement. Her research found that finite verbs are more difficult than non-finite verbs, but both within the finite verbs and within the nonfinite verbs, the forms referring to the past (third person singular past tense and participle respectively) are more difficult than their counterparts referring to the present (third person singular present tense and infinitives). None of the hypotheses on verb forms aforementioned (TPH, TUH, and TAUH) can account for these results, ever since participles in Dutch are not inflected for tense and agreement nor do they check their features in the left periphery. Similar findings have been also reported for Greek and for English respectively in a re-analysis of Nanousi et al.'s (2006) and Lee et al.'s (2008) data, and also for Turkish in  Yarbay, Duman & Bastiaanse (2009). In any case, the conclusion of Bastiaanse (2008) was that an additional hypothesis expressing that agrammatic speakers have difficulty making reference to the past was needed. In that same paper she unveiled two possible answers: (a) it could be that representations of events in the past are semantically more complex, possibly because there are two time periods of relevance. (b) It might also be the case that it is not so much reference to the past as such that is difficult for agrammatic speakers, but to express this reference by verb inflection.

See also 
 Lists of language disorders

Notes

Neurological disorders
Speech and language pathology
Language disorders
Communication disorders